Apotolype is a genus of moths in the family Lasiocampidae. The genus was erected by John G. Franclemont in 1973. It is found in southwestern North America.

Species
Based on Lepidoptera and Some Other Life Forms:
Apotolype brevicrista (Dyar, 1895) Texas, Arizona, Mexico
Apotolype blanchardi Franclemont, 1973 Texas

External links

Lasiocampidae
Moth genera